Stepan Bandera Street (Ukr. – вулиця Степана Бандери) is one of the main streets of Lviv, Ukraine. It is located on the border of Halych and Frankivsk districts of Lviv. Bandera Street connects Kopernika and Horodotska streets. It is the border of the historical place New World.

Architecture 
The buildings of the street dates back to the end of the 19th and beginning of the 20th century. The prevailing architectural styles are secession and eclecticism. The most famous building located on this street is the complex of buildings of Lviv Polytechnic National University, including the main building. The university building was opened in 1877, designed under the supervision of Julian Zakharevich, with sculptural decoration by Leonard Marconi, and interior paintings by Jan Matejko.

Name 
Throughout history, the street's name changed several times. The first name, during 1840–1886, was 'New world'. It was named Bandera in 1992, after the Ukrainian far-right leader Stepan Bandera.

Gallery

Sources 
 Архітектура Львова: Час і стилі. XIII—XXI ст / М. Бевз, Ю. Бірюльов, Ю. Богданова, В. Дідик, У. Іваночко, Т. Клименюк та інші. — Львів : Центр Європи, 2008. — 720 с. — ISBN 978-966-7022-77-8.
 Енциклопедія Львова (За редакцією А. Козицького та І. Підкови) — Львів : Літопис, 2007—2010. — Т. 1—3.
 Ілько Лемко, Михалик В., Бегляров Г. Бандери вул. // 1243 вулиці Львова (1939—2009). — Львів : Апріорі, 2009. — С. 78—80. — ISBN 978-966-2154-24-5.
 Мельник І. В. Широка—Коперника. Вулиця Коперника // Галицьке передмістя та південно-східні околиці королівського столичного міста Львова. — Львів : Апріорі, 2012. — С. 56–58. — (Львівські вулиці і кам'яниці) — ISBN 978-617-629-076-6.

References 

Streets of Lviv